This is a list of the NCAA outdoor champions in the high jump.  Measurement of the jumps was conducted in imperial distances (feet and inches) until 1975.  Metrication occurred in 1976, so all subsequent championships were measured in metric distances.

Champions
Key
A=Altitude assisted

References

GBR Athletics

External links
NCAA Division I men's outdoor track and field

High
High jump competitions
high jump